Robert Spence Watson (8 June 1837 – 2 March 1911) was an English solicitor, reformer, politician and writer. He became famous for pioneering labour arbitrations.

Life and career
He was born in Gateshead, the second child of Sarah (Spence) and Joseph Watson. After some early tutoring, he received his secondary education at Bootham School, York and began studying at University College, London in 1853; he did not complete his degree there, but during that time, and later, he travelled abroad.

He returned to the North East in 1860 and became a solicitor. He began a legal practice with his father under the name J. & R S Watson and he remained in practice there for the rest of his life.

In 1862 he became Secretary to the Literary and Philosophical Society of Newcastle upon Tyne and held that position for thirty-one years. His work led to the Society accumulating the largest independent library outside London.

On 9 June 1863 he married Elizabeth Richardson at the Friends’ meeting house, Pilgrim Street, Newcastle and they had six children.

He was one of the original convenors of the National Liberal Federation in 1877, and was its president from 1890 until 1902.

He helped to found the Durham College of Science in 1871, later to become Armstrong College and part of Newcastle University. He became its first president in 1910. He was instrumental in the founding of the Newcastle Free Public Library.

From 1890 till 1911, Watson was the president of the Society of Friends of Russian Freedom. He contributed much to the society's printed organ Free Russia.

He published "The History of English Rule and Policy in South Africa" in 1897, and joined the South Africa Conciliation Committee.

In 1995 a blue commemorative plaque was erected outside his home.

Works

"A Plan for Making the society more extensively useful, as an educational institution" (1868)
The Villages around Metz (1870) 
Cædmon, the first English poet (1875)
"The history of English rule and policy in South Africa" (1879) J. Forster, Newcastle upon Tyne.
A Visit to Wazan (1880)
"The Proper Limits of Obedience to the Law" (1887)
The History of the Literary and Philosophical Society of Newcastle-upon-Tyne (1793-1896) (1897)
 "Northumbrian Story and Song" in Lectures Delivered to the Literary and Philosophical Society, Newcastle-upon-Tyne, on Northumbrian History, Literature, and Art (1898)
The National Liberal Federation: From Its Commencement to the General Election of 1906 (1907)
 Joseph Skipsey: His Life and Work (1909) T. Fisher Unwin, London.

References

Sources
 Percy Corder (1914) The Life of Robert Spence Watson, Headley Bros., London
 John Morley, Joseph Cowen and Robert Spence Watson. Liberal Divisions in Newcastle Politics, 1873 - 1895, by E I Waitt, Thesis submitted for the degree of PhD at the University of Manchester, October 1972. Copies at Manchester University, Newcastle Central and Gateshead public libraries.
Entry on Robert Spence Watson, on Ben Beck's website
Entry on Robert Spence Watson, on the website of Watson Burton, the law firm of which he was a founding partner

External links
Parliamentary Archives, Papers of Robert Spence Watson

English Quakers
English solicitors
Politicians from Newcastle upon Tyne
Writers from Newcastle upon Tyne
Presidents of the Liberal Party (UK)
British travel writers
1837 births
1911 deaths
Members of the Privy Council of the United Kingdom
19th-century English lawyers